Sergie Sovoroff (September 17, 1901 – September 27, 1989) was an Aleut educational leader.  He was born on Umnak Island in the Aleut village of Nikolski in 1902.  Sovoroff was born only nine years before the United States government outlawed sea otter hunting.  After 1911, the need and use of iqya-x, Aleut sea kayaks, declined abruptly.  But Sovoroff continued to see a need for creating model sea kayaks, known in his days by the Russian name "baidarka".  Sovoroff "...kept up the tradition of making kayak models".  Model sea kayaks built by Sovoroff, quite often with three hatches with a Russian Orthodox priest seated in the middle hatch, can be seen in many museums around the world. These model sea kayaks, finely crafted by Sovoroff, often equipped with a rudder on the stern of the kayak, all too frequently bear the name of the person who purchased them or donated them to the museum, and not Sovoroff's.

Sergie died on September 27, 1989 and is buried in Nikolski, Alaska.  

Sovoroff built model sea kayaks from the 1910s through the 1980s  and his work and teaching served an important role of carrying Unangan sea kayak construction through a period when it appeared that the ancient art would be lost forever.  The rebirth and revitalization of Unangan iqya-x in the late 20th and early 21st century can be directly attributed to the instruction, inspiration, and dedication of Sergie Sovoroff.

Sovoroff built three-hatch kayaks called uluxtax and one-hatch kayak called iqyax. Sovoroff's models continue to inspire and instruct Alaska youth on how these boats were built and paddled, as well as the important role that they played in the ancient Aleutian culture.  Sergie's 3D (three-dimensional) models have served as a practical instructional design tool, providing blue prints for many generations of people who become intrigued with this ancient design and want to recreate models or full-scale sea kayaks.

Sovoroff's model kayaks are on display at locations such as the Anchorage Fine Arts Museum, the Aleutian Pribilof Islands Association headquarters in Anchorage, and the Unalaska School in Unalaska, Alaska, although his name is often missing from public displays.  

When invading promyshlenniks (fur hunters from Kamchatka) invaded the Aleutians, the ancient culture and traditions of building sea kayaks was significantly altered. Sovoroff preserved the blueprint, the plans of how to build model sea kayaks, one of the most important forms of transportation in the ancient Unangan culture which has persisted on the lower Alaska Peninsula and the Aleutian Islands for over 8000 years.  The Unungan iqya-x (or, in Russian, "baidarka"; or, in the Inuit language, "kayak") played a paramount role within the ancient culture, not unlike the role that automobiles assume in 21st century America. For example, in pre-1741 times, an ultimate insult from one Aleut youngster to another might be something like, "Your family doesn't even own a sea kayak!".

References

1901 births
1989 deaths
20th-century Native Americans
Alaska Native people
Aleut people
Artists from Alaska
Native American artists
People from Aleutians West Census Area, Alaska